Joseph Wright (1907 – 20 November 1936) was an English professional footballer who made nearly 100 Football League appearances playing as a goalkeeper for Leicester City, Torquay United and Brighton & Hove Albion.

Life and career
Wright was born in Gateshead in 1907. He was playing North-Eastern League football for Birtley when signed by Leicester City in 1929. He played 15 First Division matches for Leicester as backup to Jim McLaren, the last of which was a 6–6 draw with Arsenal, before joining Torquay United in 1930 as a replacement for the retired Harold Gough and Archie Bayes. He missed just one match in the 1930–31 season and was an ever-present for the first 28 league fixtures of the following season, after which time Laurie Millsom took over as first choice. Wright joined Brighton & Hove Albion in 1932 as backup for Stan Webb, but his career was curtailed by ill-health and he retired in 1934 after 14 appearances in two seasons.

He returned to Torquay where he bought a hotel, but his health worsened and he died in Newton Abbot, Devon, in 1936 at the age of 29.

References

1907 births
1936 deaths
Footballers from Gateshead
Association football goalkeepers
English footballers
Birtley F.C. players
Leicester City F.C. players
Torquay United F.C. players
Brighton & Hove Albion F.C. players
English Football League players
Date of birth missing